Yauna refers to variously

 a Tucanoan language spoken in Colombia: Yauna language
 an alternation spelling of Yona
  — Old Persian name of the Ionians and Greeks, extended from the name Ionia, see names of the Greeks.